Mullis is a surname found in the European nations of England, Switzerland and Russia, with the variant Moulis found in France and Czechoslovakia. Mullies and Mulliss are variants found in England and America.

Notable people with the name include:

 Alastair Mullis, British professor of law
 Betty L. Mullis, United States Air Force pilot
 Jeff Mullis, American politician from Georgia
 Kary Mullis (1944–2019), American Nobel Prize-winning biochemist
 Stan Mullis (born 1976), American professional stock car racing driver
 Robert Mullis (born 2007), American professional football player

See also
 Mollis (disambiguation)
 Mulli (disambiguation)

References